Midnight Plateau is a prominent ice-covered plateau, over  high, forming the central feature of the Darwin Mountains in Antarctica. It is the only area of snow accumulation in the Darwin Mountains. The plateau was discovered by the Victoria University of Wellington Antarctic Expedition of 1962–63 and so named because the feature was visited by expedition members at midnight on December 27, 1962.

Further reading 
 Gunter Faure, Teresa M. Mensing, The Transantarctic Mountains: Rocks, Ice, Meteorites and Water, P 298

References

Plateaus of Oates Land
East Antarctica